Paul Davies-Hale (born 21 June 1962) is an English former long-distance runner. He won the 2000 metres steeplechase at the 1981 European Junior Championships and went on to represent Great Britain at the 1984 Los Angeles Olympics and the 1992 Barcelona Olympics.

Career
Davies-Hale was a promising junior cross-country runner from Rugeley, Staffordshire.
He progressed to the track and represented England in the 3000 metres steeplechase event, at the 1982 Commonwealth Games in Brisbane, Queensland, Australia. he then represented Great Britain at the 1984 Los Angeles Olympics running the 3000m steeplechase.

In 1985 he moved to Boulder, Colorado to train. He moved up to the longer distances of Half Marathon and eventually the Marathon. He won the 1989 Chicago Marathon, his first ever marathon, which was a hot and humid race. In the race he overtook compatriot David Long and beat Russian Ravil Kashapov by two minutes. In 1991, he finished second in the Great North Run just seven seconds behind the Kenyan Benson Masya.

Eight years after his first appearance at the Summer Olympics, he competed again at the 1992 Barcelona Olympics in the Marathon. He finished 41st behind both British runners David Long, 39th, and Steve Brace, 27th.

Davies-Hale has organised several running events including the 'Action Heart race', 'Baggeridge 5K', 'Suicide Six' and 'Sheepwalks Shocker'.

International competitions

Other Races

References

External links

sports-reference

1962 births
Living people
People from Rugeley
Sportspeople from Staffordshire
English male marathon runners
English male steeplechase runners
English male cross country runners
British male steeplechase runners
British male cross country runners
Olympic athletes of Great Britain
Athletes (track and field) at the 1984 Summer Olympics
Athletes (track and field) at the 1992 Summer Olympics
Commonwealth Games competitors for England
Athletes (track and field) at the 1982 Commonwealth Games
Chicago Marathon male winners